Nong Sung is a district (amphoe) of Mukdahan province, northeastern Thailand.

Geography
Neighboring districts are (from the north clockwise) Khamcha-i, Mueang Mukdahan, and Nikhom Kham Soi of Mukdahan Province; Loeng Nok Tha of Yasothon province; Nong Phok of Roi Et province; and Kuchinarai of Kalasin province.

History
The minor district (king amphoe) was established on 1 March 1985, when five tambons were split off from Khamcha-i district. It was upgraded on 3 November 1993.

Administration 
The district is divided into six sub-districts (tambon), which are further subdivided into 44 villages (muban). There are no municipal (thesaban) areas, and five tambon administrative organization (TAO).

References

External links
amphoe.com

Nong Sung